The Vickers Type 163 was a prototype British biplane bomber design of the 1930s, built by Vickers-Armstrong.

It was based on the Vickers Vanox (Vickers "Type 150") scaled up to take four engines in paired mountings. It was submitted both as a bomber and as a troop carrier to Air Ministry specifications B.19/27 and C.16/28 respectively, first flying on 12 January 1931.
Only one was produced.

Specifications (Type 163)

References

 Mason, Francis K. The British Bomber since 1914. London: Putnam Aeronautical Books, 1994. .
 Vickers 163 – British Aircraft Directory

1920s British bomber aircraft
Type 163
Aircraft first flown in 1931
Biplanes